Iron nitrate may refer to:

 Iron(II) nitrate, Fe(NO3)2, a green compound that is unstable to heat
 Iron(III) nitrate (or ferric nitrate), Fe(NO3)3, a pale violet compound that has a low melting point